Ace of aces may refer to:

Books
 Ace of Aces, the title of several biographies of Dick Bong
 Ace of Aces, the title of Teddy Suhren's memoirs
 Ace of Aces, the title of Rene Fonck's autobiography
 Ace of Aces, the title of a biography of Marmaduke Pattle
 Ace of Aces, the title of a biography of Eddie Rickenbacker

Films
Ace of Aces (1933 film), an American World War I film starring Richard Dix
Ace of Aces (1982 film), a French-German comedy starring Jean-Paul Belmondo

Games
 Ace of Aces (picture book game), based on World War I aerial warfare
 Ace of Aces (video game), a computer game based on World War II aerial warfare

Other
 Ace of Aces (horse)

See also
 Ace (disambiguation)